Sentimental Me is the fourth studio album by Wet Wet Wet frontman Marti Pellow. Released on April 14, 2008, the album spawned the single "Take a Letter, Miss Jones", released on July 14, 2008.

The album sees Marti explore new territory, taking on a number of classic jazz standards, together with multi-award winning jazz pianist Jim Watson.  All instrumentation was arranged by Marti himself, with a stronger focus on the tempo, enabling a move away from the big band feel usually associated with some of these tracks. The album includes one original composition, "Chicago Rose", written with frequent collaborators Chris Difford and James Hallawell.

The album was promoted with the "Songs for Lovers" tour, a 14-date run which took place throughout April 2008.

Track listing

References

2008 albums
Marti Pellow albums